List of Guggenheim Fellowships awarded in 1928. Fifty-nine fellowships were awarded to individuals from more than 20 states and 16 previous winners had their fellowships extended.

1928 U.S. and Canadian Fellows

See also
 Guggenheim Fellowship
 List of Guggenheim Fellowships awarded in 1927
 List of Guggenheim Fellowships awarded in 1929

References

1928
1928 awards